Agelasta lacteostictica is a species of beetle in the family Cerambycidae. It was described by Stephan von Breuning in 1960. It is known from the Philippines.

References

lacteostictica
Beetles described in 1960